Ronald "Flip" Murray (born July 29, 1979) is a retired American professional basketball player who last played for Al Mouttahed Tripoli of the Lebanese Basketball League. After attending Strawberry Mansion High School in Philadelphia, where he starred on the basketball team, he played college basketball for four seasons, first at the Meridian Community College in Meridian, Mississippi from 1997 to 1999, and then at Shaw University located in Raleigh, North Carolina from 2000 to 2002. He is nicknamed "Flip" by childhood friends who often said he looked like Bernie Mac's character, "Flip", from the movie Above The Rim.

Career
Murray was drafted by the Milwaukee Bucks with pick number 42 in the second round of the 2002 NBA Draft, after being NCAA's Division II Player of the Year during his senior season at Shaw, as he led the Shaw University Bears to the Division II Final Four in basketball. In his first few NBA seasons he played for the Bucks and for the SuperSonics in Seattle, where he developed as a scoring threat in 2003–04, substituting for Ray Allen who missed 26 games due to injury, averaging 12 points in 25 minutes, while appearing in all 82 matches.

On February 23, 2006, he was traded by Seattle to the Cleveland Cavaliers in exchange for Mike Wilks and cash considerations. In his brief stint with the Cavs, Murray averaged his career-highs in nearly every category.

On July 18, 2006, Murray signed with the Detroit Pistons for $3.6 million over two years, in an effort by the team to improve its bench depth. In the 2006–07 season, Murray started eighteen games (twelve in place of point guard Chauncey Billups and six in place of shooting guard Richard Hamilton).

On February 22, 2008, Murray was waived by the Pistons. On March 1, he was signed by the Indiana Pacers. There was an expectation the Los Angeles Clippers would sign Murray, but he elected to go with the Pacers instead.

On August 13, 2008, Murray signed with the Atlanta Hawks.

On September 25, 2009, the Charlotte Bobcats signed Murray reportedly to a one-year $1.99 million contract.

On February 18, 2010, Murray was traded in a packaged deal to the Chicago Bulls for Tyrus Thomas. Murray's final NBA game was played in Game 5 of the 2010 Eastern Conference First Round against the Cleveland Cavaliers on April 27th, 2010. The Bulls would lose Game 5 to the Cavs 94 - 96 with Murray recording 6 points and 3 rebounds. Chicago dropped the series to Cleveland 4 - 1.

On January 13, 2011 he signed with the Turkish team Efes Pilsen S.K. until the end of the 2010–11 season.

In October 2012, he signed with the Memphis Grizzlies, but he did not make the team's regular season roster.

In January 2013, he signed with the Ukrainian team Azovmash Mariupol.

On October 31, 2013, he was reacquired by the Austin Toros of the NBA Development League. On April 11, 2014, he signed with Al Mouttahed Tripoli of Lebanon for the rest of the 2013–14 season.

Miscellaneous
NCAA Division II Player of the Year during his senior season at Shaw University
Led Seattle SuperSonics' 2003 summer-league team with 22.9 ppg
Sonics 2003 opening-night starter at shooting guard
Hit game-winning shot over Latrell Sprewell at the buzzer in 89-87 Seattle victory at Minnesota on November 11, 2003
Scored career-high 31 points for Seattle on 11-23 shooting vs. Miami on November 18, 2003
Scored 20 or more points in 10 of first 11 games of 2003-04 season, in absence of Ray Allen
Selected to play in the 2004 Rookie Challenge. Representing the SuperSonics, Murray scored 25 points and dished out 10 assists for the sophomores.
Tied career high 31 points for the Charlotte Bobcats against Orlando on November 16, 2009
Has played for every NBA team in the Central Division (Bulls, Bucks, Cavaliers, Pacers, Pistons).

NBA career statistics

Regular season 

|-
| align="left" | 
| align="left" | Milwaukee
| 12 || 0 || 34.1 || 16.2 || .000 || 345 || .1 || .3 || .3 || .0 || 1.9
|-
| align="left" | 
| align="left" | Seattle
| 2 || 0 || 10.0 || .400 || .000 || .000 || 1.5 || 1.0 || .0 || .0 || 2.0
|-
| align="left" | 
| align="left" | Seattle
| 82 || 18 || 24.6 || .425 || .293 || .715 || 2.5 || 2.5 || 1.0 || .3 || 12.4
|-
| align="left" | 
| align="left" | Seattle
| 49 || 6 || 18.0 || .361 || .253 || .738 || 2.0 || 1.3 || .6 || .2 || 7.0
|-
| align="left" | 
| align="left" | Seattle
| 48 || 2 || 22.6 || .397 || .224 || .717 || 1.8 || 2.5 || .6 || .1 || 9.9
|-
| align="left" | 
| align="left" | Cleveland
| 28 || 25 || 36.7 || .448 || .308 || .702 || 2.4 || 2.8 || 1.4 || .3 || 13.5
|-
| align="left" | 
| align="left" | Detroit
| 69 || 18 || 21.4 || .404 || .289 || .725 || 1.6 || 2.7 || .7 || .2 || 6.7
|-
| align="left" | 
| align="left" | Detroit
| 19 || 2 || 18.3 || .410 || .222 || .595 || 1.9 || 3.4 || .7 || .1 || 7.5
|-
| align="left" | 
| align="left" | Indiana
| 23 || 17 || 22.9 || .425 || .389 || .754 || 2.0 || 3.5 || 1.1 || .1 || 11.0
|-
| align="left" | 
| align="left" | Atlanta
| 80 || 2 || 24.7 || .447 || .360 || .760 || 2.1 || 2.0 || 1.1 || .2 || 12.2
|-
| align="left" | 
| align="left" | Charlotte
| 46 || 1 || 21.6 || .389 || .313 || .710 || 2.1 || 1.8 || .6 || .3 || 9.9
|-
| align="left" | 
| align="left" | Chicago
| 29 || 1 || 23.4 || .397 || .311 || .762 || 2.9 || 1.8 || .6 || .1 || 10.1
|- class="sortbottom"
| style="text-align:center;" colspan="2"| Career
| 487 || 92 || 22.7 || .414 || .304 || .725 || 2.1 || 2.3 || .8 || .2 || 9.9

Playoffs 

|-
| align="left" | 2005
| align="left" | Seattle
| 4 || 0 || 15.5 || .211 || .000 || .571 || 1.5 || 1.3 || .0 || .5 || 3.0
|-
| align="left" | 2006
| align="left" | Cleveland
| 13 || 5 || 30.7 || .330 || .208 || .813 || 3.2 || 1.6 || .7 || .2 || 8.1
|-
| align="left" | 2007
| align="left" | Detroit
| 12 || 0 || 11.3 || .355 || .000 || .727 || .8 || 1.2 || .3 || .1 || 2.5
|-
| align="left" | 2009
| align="left" | Atlanta
| 11 || 0 || 31.0 || .341 || .280 || .865 || 2.7 || 2.5 || 1.1 || .3 || 11.8
|-
| align="left" | 2010
| align="left" | Chicago
| 5 || 0 || 19.4 || .405 || .333 || 1.000 || 2.6 || 2.0 || .4 || .0 || 8.4
|- class="sortbottom"
| style="text-align:center;" colspan="2"| Career
| 45 || 5 || 23.0 || .339 || .256 || .821 || 2.2 || 1.7 || .6 || .2 || 7.1

References

External links

ESPN.com Profile

1979 births
Living people
American expatriate basketball people in Lebanon
American expatriate basketball people in Turkey
American expatriate basketball people in Ukraine
American men's basketball players
Anadolu Efes S.K. players
Atlanta Hawks players
Austin Toros players
BC Azovmash players
Charlotte Bobcats players
Chicago Bulls players
Cleveland Cavaliers players
Community College of Philadelphia alumni
Detroit Pistons players
Indiana Pacers players
Meridian Eagles basketball players
Milwaukee Bucks draft picks
Milwaukee Bucks players
Point guards
Seattle SuperSonics players
Shaw Bears men's basketball players
Shooting guards
Basketball players from Philadelphia